Langside railway station is a railway station that serves the Langside and Newlands area of Glasgow, Scotland. It is located on the Cathcart Circle Line. Services are provided by ScotRail on behalf of Strathclyde Partnership for Transport.

History 

The station was opened as part of the western extension of the Cathcart District Railway on 2 April 1894. It consists of a single island platform accessed by a subway and stairs to Langside Drive at the west end, and Earls Park Avenue and Tanahill Road to the east, with a self-service ticket machine added in spring 2007.  The Cathcart Circle Line has been electrified since 1962 by British Railways.

Services

1974 to 1979 
Between the electrification of the WCML and the opening of the Argyle Line, trains ran Mondays to Saturdays, with two Cathcart Circle trains per hour in each direction and two  to  trains per hour in each direction. Occasional peak hour trains were extended through to  via the Hamilton Circle lines.

1979 to early 1990s 
Following the opening of the Argyle line, Kirkhill services were extended through to Newton.

Early 1990s to present day (2016) 
The service pattern has been revised to include Sunday trains.

There is a higher frequency of trains in the weekday morning and evening rush hour periods.

Routes

References

Notes

Sources 

 
 
 
 

Railway stations in Glasgow
Former Caledonian Railway stations
Railway stations in Great Britain opened in 1894
SPT railway stations
Railway stations served by ScotRail